Nancy Krieger is an American epidemiologist who is professor of social epidemiology in the Department of Social and Behavioral Sciences at the Harvard T.H. Chan School of Public Health.

Education and career
Krieger studied biochemistry as an undergraduate at Harvard University and earned a master's degree at the University of Washington.  Krieger received her PhD in epidemiology from University of California, Berkeley in 1989. She joined the faculty of the Harvard T.H. Chan School of Public Health in 1995. In 2004, she became an ISI highly cited researcher.

Research
Krieger has conducted research on the relationship between racism, social class, and health in the United States since the 1980s. In 2008, she conducted research that found that socioeconomic disparities in mortality rates had narrowed from 1966 to 1980, but had widened since then. In 2015, she and her colleagues published a paper arguing that law enforcement-related deaths in the United States should be a "notifiable condition", meaning that public health workers would have to report such deaths to a state or local agency.

Personal life
Krieger is one of two children of endocrinologist Dorothy Krieger and neurologist Howard Krieger. Her brother, Jim Krieger, is the director of Healthy Food America.

References

External links
Faculty page

Harvard School of Public Health faculty
Living people
UC Berkeley School of Public Health alumni
American women epidemiologists
American epidemiologists
American public health doctors
University of Washington alumni
Year of birth missing (living people)
Harvard College alumni
21st-century American women
Women public health doctors